Haiti allows citizens from most countries to stay visa free for 3 months.

All non-Haitian passport holders must pay a tourist fee of US$10 on arrival.

Visitors must hold passports that are valid for at least 6 months from the date of arrival.

Visa policy map

Visa in advance

As per the Embassy of Haiti in Washington, D.C.'s website, pre-arranged visas are required for nationals of the following countries: 

However, according to IATA, pre-arranged visas are required for nationals of the following countries: 

These countries may enter visa free for 3 months if they hold a valid United States, Canadian, or Schengen visa or a resident permit or if they are of Haitian origin.

See also

Visa requirements for Haitian citizens

References

Haiti
Foreign relations of Haiti
Law of Haiti